Eupithecia fletcherata, or Fletcher's larch looper, is a moth of the family Geometridae described by George Taylor in 1907. It is found in Canada (Newfoundland and Labrador, Nova Scotia, New Brunswick, Quebec, Ontario and Manitoba) and the north-eastern parts of the United States (including Ohio and Missouri).

The wingspan is about 17 mm. The moth flies from April to September depending on the location. The larva feeds on eastern larch and white spruce. It has also been recorded on red and black spruces.

The species was named in honour of Dr. James Fletcher.

References

Moths described in 1907
fletcherata
Moths of North America